Mukand Limited (formerly Mukand Iron & Steel Works Limited) is an India-based manufacturer of stainless steel, alloy steel, and stainless steel billets, and is an exporter of hot rolled bars. The company manufactures iron and steel products, steel castings, steel structurals, Electrical Overhead Travelling (EOT) and other cranes, and other industrial machinery. Mukand Ltd is part of the Bajaj Groups of companies. It makes India's largest gantry crane, with an 80-tonne capacity and 60-metre span, with monobox girder and underslung trolley.

History
Mukand was established in 1929 in Lahore by Seth Mukand Lal. It was later acquired by Bajaj and moved to Mumbai in 1937. A steel plant at Kalwa, Thane commenced operations in 1965. It was renamed to Mukand Ltd from Mukand Iron & Steel Works Limited on 23 March 1989.

It also operates a steel plant in Ginigera of Hospet district in collaboration with Hospet Steel.

References

Manufacturing companies based in Mumbai
Steel companies of India
Manufacturing companies established in 1937
Bajaj Group
Indian companies established in 1937
Companies listed on the National Stock Exchange of India
Companies listed on the Bombay Stock Exchange